A dummy candidate is a candidate who stands for election, usually with no intention or realistic chance of winning.

A dummy candidate can serve any of the following purposes:

 In instant-runoff voting, a dummy candidate may direct preferences to other candidates in order to increase the serious candidate's share of the vote.
 A dummy candidate may be used by a serious candidate to overcome limits on advertising or campaign financing. For example, in India, there have been cases of serious candidates fielding multiple dummy candidates to distribute their poll expenses. The expenses are directed towards the campaign of the serious candidate, but shown to the election commission under the dummy candidates' names.
 Dummy candidates with names similar to that of a more established candidate may be fielded by political parties to confuse the voters, and cut that candidate's vote share. The dummy candidate's name also may be deceptively similar to that of a retiring incumbent, a former candidate or officeholder, or even a deceased former candidate or officeholder.  (The Eddie Murphy film The Distinguished Gentleman was somewhat based on this premise.) For example, in the 2014 Indian general elections, there were seven candidates named Chandu Lal Sahu and another four named Chandu Ram Sahu in the Mahasamund. The serious candidate – Chandu Lal Sahu of the Bharatiya Janata Party – received 503,514 votes, but his margin of win was just 1,217 votes. The dummy candidates received the votes intended for him, with one of them finishing third in the constituency. To solve this problem, the Election Commission of India is designing Electronic Voting Machines with candidates' photographs. In the 1982 Glasgow Hillhead by-election, a minor candidate changed his name to "Roy Harold Jenkins" to confuse voters looking for Roy H. Jenkins.
A dummy candidate may serve as a placeholder for a party in a primary and then withdraw after winning the primary, allowing the leadership of the party an opportunity to nominate the candidate they really desire to fill their line for the general election.
 Dummy candidates can also result from candidates withdrawing from a particular race, but being unable to pull their name off the ballot, remaining listed as a choice.

References

See also
Perennial candidate
Paper candidate
Placeholder (politics)
Stalking horse

Political terminology
Elections terminology